The Czech Republic Individual Speedway Championship is a Motorcycle speedway championship held each year to determine the Czech Republic national champion.

History
It was first staged in 1949, and was known as the Czechoslovakia Individual Speedway Championship until 1992, when the country then divided into the Czech Republic and Slovakia. Jiří Štancl is the most successful rider having won the title 12 times, including ten years in a row from 1972 to 1981.

Winners

See also
 Sport in the Czech Republic

References

Czech Republic
Grand Prix